At least two albums contain a song called "Stigmata Martyr":
In the Flat Field, the debut album by British gothic rock band Bauhaus, released 1980
The Death of Tragedy (Abney Park album), released 2005